Raue is a surname. Notable people with the surname include:

Brigitte Raue, German rower
Christian Raue (1613–1677), German orientalist and theologian
Charles Gottlieb Raue (1820–1896), American homeopathic physician
Tim Raue (born 1974), German chef